Wallberg is a mountain in the Mangfallgebirge, in the south of Bavaria, Germany.

Wallberg may also refer to:

 Wallberg building, at the University of Toronto

People with the surname Wallberg
 Frida Wallberg (born 1983), Swedish boxer
 Heinz Wallberg (1923–2004), German conductor
 Johan Wallberg (born 1977), Swedish freestyle swimmer
 Mats Wallberg (born 1949), Swedish speed skater

See also 
 Walburg (disambiguation)
 St. Walburg (disambiguation)
 Walberg, surname
 Wallburg (disambiguation)
 Wahlberg (disambiguation)